Post Office Investigator is a 1949  black and white American crime film about the theft of postage stamps, directed by George Blair, and starring Audrey Long, Warren Douglas and Jeff Donnell. Allmovie called it a "diligent Republic programmer."

Plot
A young postman becomes involved in the theft of rare stamps featuring inverted images of the Statue of Liberty. Along the way he encounters attractive criminal Clara Kelso, double-crossing gang members, and Post Office Inspectors, before finally capturing the crooks.

Cast
Audrey Long as Clara Kelso
Warren Douglas as Bill Mannerson
Jeff Donnell as April Shaughnessy
Marcel Journet as George Zelger
Richard Benedict as- Louis Reese
Jimmie Dodd as Eddie Waltch

Critical reception
TV Guide wrote, "(Audrey) Long proves to be quite convincing as the tough lass who won't let herself be pushed around. Plot as a whole is weak, but the direction keeps up a suspenseful pace."
Noir of the week.com called it "a very enjoyable quick paced timewaster!"

External links

References

1949 films
American crime thriller films
American black-and-white films
1940s crime thriller films
Film noir
Republic Pictures films
Films directed by George Blair
1940s English-language films
1940s American films